The Swansea Friends Meeting House and Cemetery, at 223 Prospect Street in Somerset, Massachusetts, are a pair of religious properties believed to include the oldest extant Quaker meetinghouse in the state, with the oldest surviving meetinghouse form in which the pulpit and entrance face each other across the building's short dimension (instead of the 19th century form, where they stand at opposite ends of the long dimension). The oldest portion of the building dates to 1702, when Somerset was part of Swansea. In the 19th century the balconies were closed off to provide office space. The cemetery adjacent to the meetinghouse is also believed to be of great age; its oldest dated marker is 1831, but 18th century Quaker practice did not generally include the laying of markers, so there are likely a number of unmarked early graves.

The property was listed on the National Register of Historic Places in 2014.

See also
National Register of Historic Places listings in Bristol County, Massachusetts

References

National Register of Historic Places in Bristol County, Massachusetts
Religious buildings and structures completed in 1702
Somerset, Massachusetts
Cemeteries in Bristol County, Massachusetts
Quaker meeting houses in Massachusetts
1702 establishments in Massachusetts
Cemeteries established in the 18th century